Hang on the Box (known also as HOTB) is a punk band based in Beijing. They were China's first all-female punk band. The band usually sings about sex and relationship issues in a forward political manner. Their record label is Sister Benten Online, based in Japan. The band consists of the following line-up: Wang Yue, known as Gia Wang, on vocals, Yilina playing bass, Li Yan Fan playing guitar, and Shenjing on drums.

At Hang on the Box's first performance at Beijing's Scream Club in 1998, their songs did not have lyrics and only high-pitched screeching accompanied their power chords. They were featured on the cover the local edition of Newsweek six months later.

Their music could be described as cheerful and hilarious, deadly serious, and personally political. Most of the questionable content involved comes in the form of native Chinese speakers using English commonplace epithets.

Gia Wang has said that in the early days it was hard for the band to play in China and they were not welcomed by the Chinese market so without signing to a Japanese label she would have been unable to continue her music career.

Members 
Gia (王悦) – vocals (1998-)
Axu (徐京晨) – guitar
North (北北) – bass
Desi-Fan (德思凡) – drums

Former members 
 Yang Fan (扬帆) – original guitarist (1998–2003)
 Yilian (隐退) – original bassist (1998-)
 Shen Jing (沈静) – original drummer (1998-)
 tookoo – guitar
 Ubi (邓力源) – guitar (2010–2013)
 Niu Fang Fang (牛方方) – bass (2010–2015)
 Yang Yang (杨扬) – drummer (2010–2015)

Discography 
Yellow Banana (2001)
Di Di Di (2003)
For Every Punk Bitch and Arsehole (2003)
Foxy Lady (2004)
No More Nice Girls (2007)
Kiss Kiss, Bang Bang (2013)
Oracles (2017)

See also 
Chinese rock
Cobra
Sister Benten Online

References

External links 
Homepage
HOTB in the Rock in China wiki, complete discography & biography
Sister Benten Records Online

All-female punk bands
Chinese punk rock groups
Musical groups from Beijing